The Olympic Park railway line is a railway line linking the Sydney Olympic Park precinct to the Main Suburban railway line at Flemington and Lidcombe. Originally opened as the Abattoirs branch in 1911, it was rebuilt and reopened as the Olympic Park railway line in 1998. Passenger services have since been running on it as the Olympic Park Line (numbered T7, grey).

History

Abattoirs branch 
The line opened on 31 July 1911 as the Abattoirs branch off the Main Suburban railway line to the abattoirs and State Brickworks at Homebush Bay (now Sydney Olympic Park). It branched off via a triangular junction behind Flemington Maintenance Depot making it accessible from the Metropolitan Goods line.

Two bridges carried the line over the Great Western Highway. On 11 January 1915, the Metropolitan Meat Platforms opened. Further platforms opened at Abattoirs in December 1926, Brickworks in December 1939 and Pippita in October 1940 to serve a Commonwealth Aircraft Corporation factory. Sidings on the line served Dairy Farmers and Ford.

On 27 February 1968, the three kilometre Homebush Saleyards Yard opened to service new cattle and sheep pens built to replace facilities at Flemington just beyond the Great Western Highway crossing. The loop was electrified to allow 46 class locomotives to operate services from the Main Western and Main Northern lines to the saleyards.

Passenger services were operated by CPH railmotors operating from Sandown via Lidcombe until November 1984. On 9 November 1984, the line beyond the Homebush Saleyards closed. After this the line (now only going to Pippita) would be served by Single Deck Suburban "Red Rattlers".

The Saleyards Loop closed on 22 June 1991. Pippita continued to be served by a sole daily service to Central until 20 October 1995, operated in its later days by a V set. Only traces of the line remain beyond Pippita. The Dairy Farmers siding is still connected to the present-day Up Homebush Bay West Fork track, complete with catch points and a shunt signal. Remnants of the track can also be seen between the siding and the western bridge across the Great Western Highway. There is no trace of the line past here.

Reopening 
As part of Sydney's successful bid to hold the 2000 Olympic Games, a new Sydney Olympic Park precinct was built. Included was a railway that traversed a similar route to the former Abattoirs branch. The line was built with a balloon loop and the two track, four platform Olympic Park station. The line utilised the existing eastern bridge over the Great Western Highway which had previously only carried one track, but was wide enough to accommodate the two laid. The new line opened on 8 March 1998.

Today, the line continues to transport people to and from major events occurring within the Sydney Olympic Park precinct, but also carries workers and residents of Olympic Park to and from the rest of the Sydney Trains network.

Service 

Outside of special events, trains on the Olympic Park Line (T7) depart from a special platform at Lidcombe (platform 0, previously referred to as the Olympic Park Sprint Platform). Services operate with a frequency of one train every 10 minutes in each direction, dropping to 20 minutes at night.  The trip between Lidcombe and Olympic Park takes about five minutes each way. As of Friday 23 October 2020, 4-car M sets are scheduled for these trips on weekdays, while 8-car A sets are scheduled on weekends and public holidays. K sets were rostered until then, and until the S sets were retired, they were also rostered.

During major events at Sydney Olympic Park, train services run direct from the intercity platforms of Central, also sometimes stopping at Redfern and Strathfield. The Lidcombe shuttle trains are also built up to 8 cars. After larger events, west-bound trains from Olympic Park are sometimes extended beyond Lidcombe to Blacktown via the Western line, and to Glenfield and Campbelltown via the Main South line, using platforms 2 and 4 at Lidcombe instead. These services are normally run by 8-car A, B or T sets.

Patronage
The following table shows the patronage of Sydney Trains network for the year ending 30 June 2022. Because these figures are based on Opal tap on and tap off data, passengers are not counted when travelling to major events where the event ticket also allows travel on public transport services.

References

External links

 
Sydney Trains